Bows were a British-based band, who have released two albums on the Too Pure label.

History
Following the dissolution of his former band Long Fin Killie, multi-instrumentalist Luke Sutherland formed Bows with the Danish singer Signe Høirup Wille-Jørgensen. Specializing in a kind of lush trip hop with grand arrangements, the band have met with some critical success.

The band's debut album, Blush, was released in 1999 to generally positive reviews.

Second album Cassidy followed in 2001.

Discography

Albums 
Blush (1999), Too Pure
Cassidy (2001), Too Pure

Singles, EPs
"Blush" (1999), Too Pure
"Britannica" (1999), Too Pure
"Big Wings" (1999), Too Pure
"Pink Puppet" (2001), Too Pure

References

External links
 
 

Trip hop groups
British electronic music groups
English pop music groups